The Glee Project is an American reality television series from Oxygen. It served as an audition for the Fox musical comedy series Glee, and the prize for the winner was a minimum seven-episode arc in the following season of the show. The show's first season premiered in the US on June 12, 2011, and concluded on August 21, 2011. In Canada, the series began airing on Slice on June 26, 2011, and in the UK, the series began airing on Sky 1 on July 14, 2011. A second season aired in the US from June 5 to August 14, 2012. In July 2013, it was announced that The Glee Project would not return for a third season.

Glee executive producers Ryan Murphy and Dante Di Loreto executive produced for The Glee Project. Glee casting director, Robert J. Ulrich, was casting director for the project, while Glee on-screen non-speaking accompanist, Brad Ellis, helping Ulrich coach 80 potential candidates as seen in the music segment of "The Top 12" special that led into the pilot episode of season 1.

Contest process

Each episode of The Glee Project was given an overall theme and covered events that had taken place in about the time span of a week. The following is how the events were broadcast.

Homework assignment 
Contestants were given a "homework assignment" that entailed learning and practicing segments of a chosen song. At the beginning of each episode, contestants performed their respective parts of the song in front of a mystery guest judge from the Glee cast. The contestant that completed the homework best was given a one-on-one session with the guest star and a principal part in the music video.

Music video (group performance) 
Contestants then created a music video "inspired by the performances on Glee". In preparation for the music video, contestants recorded parts of a song in a professional studio with vocal producer Nikki Anders (née Hassman). They also learned choreography from Zach Woodlee and/or Brooke Lipton, his assistant. The entire process was overseen by Glee casting director Robert J. Ulrich.

Callbacks 
During callbacks, the top performing contestants were revealed. They were complimented on their performances and immediately called back. Then the remaining ones were critiqued by Robert J. Ulrich and Zach Woodlee, and also in the second season by Nikki Anders, about their performances. (Anders substituted for Woodlee in Ep. 8 of the first season.) Then the bottom three contestants were revealed as others were added to the callback list. They were then each assigned a different song that they will perform in hopes of being "saved".

During season 1, Nikki visited each of the bottom in their dressing/rehearsal room to provide last minute feedback and a pep talk.

Last chance performance 
The bottom three of the week performed their assigned songs in front of Ryan Murphy himself. With input from Woodlee, Ulrich, and Anders (in the second season) a decision was made and one of the bottom three was eliminated.

During the next to last episode of each season Ryan didn't include the mentors; instead he invited co-creator Ian Brennan to join him. In the final episodes, Murphy, Woodlee, Ulrich, Anders, and Brennan were also joined by several of the guest mentors, writers, and cast members.

Final callbacks 
Unlike most reality competition shows, contestants were not directly informed of their elimination, nor did they wait for extended tension-filled pauses to hear the results one by one. Rather, the bottom three were notified when "the list is up" and discovered their fate as they found their name on the list. Afterwards, the eliminated contestant sang lead vocals in "Keep Holding On" by Avril Lavigne with the remaining contestants singing the background vocals.

Season one (2011)
Although originally planned to begin broadcasting in late May 2011, The Glee Project premiered on June 12, 2011, and aired a two-hour extended premiere where the first hour showed the audition process and selection of the twelve contenders, and the second hour was the first episode of the series. The Canadian and UK premieres were also in the same two-hour extended format: in Canada, the series began airing on Slice on June 26, 2011, and in the UK, the series began airing on Sky One on July 14, 2011.

Damian McGinty and Samuel Larsen were both proclaimed the winners of the first season, each winning a seven-episode arc. Runners-up Lindsay Pearce and Alex Newell were given prizes of a two-episode arc on Glee, and Cameron Mitchell, who quit the competition in episode 7, won the "fan favorite" competition and the associated $10,000 prize. Pearce's two-episode arc, as a Rachel Berry-esque girl named Harmony, consisted of the season premiere episode "The Purple Piano Project" and the eighth episode "Hold On to Sixteen", while McGinty began his arc as Rory Flanagan, an Irish exchange student, in the fourth episode "Pot o' Gold"; McGinty was retained on the show beyond his seven-episode prize. Larsen debuted on Glee in the thirteenth episode, "Heart", as a transfer student named Joe Hart, also appearing beyond his original seven-episode stint. Newell's first appearance was in the April 17, 2012, episode "Saturday Night Glee-ver". They played Wade Adams, a transgender member of the rival Vocal Adrenaline show choir, and appeared briefly in "Props", returning a few more times before transferring to McKinley High for the series' fourth season and becoming a series regular for its fifth season.

McGinty, Larsen, Pearce and Newell were chosen to sing on the 2011 Glee Christmas album, Glee: The Music, The Christmas Album Volume 2.

Contenders

Episodes

Contender progress

Key
 SAFE   The contender was not at risk of elimination.
 WIN  The contender won the homework assignment and was not at risk of elimination.
 W/R  The contender won the homework assignment but was at risk of being eliminated.
 RISK  The contender sang for Ryan and was immediately safe.
 RISK  The contender was at risk of being eliminated.
 ELIM  The contender was eliminated.
 W/E  The contender won the homework assignment but was eliminated.
 QUIT  The contender quit the competition.
 SAVED  The contender was to be eliminated, but was saved due to another contender quitting.
 WINNER  The contender won a 7-episode arc on Glee.
 HIGH  The contender was called back without any notes.
 W/H  The contender won the homework assignment and was high on the main challenge.
 W/L  The contender won the homework assignment and was low on the main challenge.
 LOW  The contender was in risk of going to the bottom three but was ultimately safe. Used from the third episode forward when 4 people are being judged.
 RUNNER-UP  The contender won a 2-episode arc on Glee.

Season two (2012)
Casting for a second season was announced after the first season finale. The season pickup was confirmed on January 17, 2012, at which time it was stated that the second season would feature fourteen contestants, an increase of two from the twelve in the first season.  On January 21, 2012, Lea Michele revealed that she would be the guest mentor for the season premiere. Other guest mentors would include season 1 co-winner Samuel Larsen (Joe Hart), Cory Monteith (Finn Hudson), Naya Rivera (Santana Lopez), Jane Lynch (Sue Sylvester), Amber Riley (Mercedes Jones), Chris Colfer (Kurt Hummel), Dianna Agron (Quinn Fabray) and returning season 1 mentors Darren Criss (Blaine Anderson) and Kevin McHale (Artie Abrams).

The second season premiered in the US on June 5, 2012, and ran for eleven weeks, concluding on August 14, 2012. There was one winner for the season: Blake Jenner won the seven-episode arc on Glee. He made his first appearance in the fifth episode of season four, "The Role You Were Born to Play", as a McKinley student named Ryder Lynn. He was a recurring character for 18 episodes on season 4 and was promoted to series regular on season 5. Ali Stroker, the runner up, also made an unexpected first appearance in the fourth season episode, "I Do", as Betty Pillsbury.

Dani Shay, who was the third person eliminated, was previously a contestant on America's Got Talent (season 6) going as far as the quarter-finals.

Contenders

Episodes

Contender progress

Key
 SAFE   The contender was not at risk of elimination.
 WIN  The contender won the homework assignment and was not at risk of elimination.
 FIRST  The contender was called first on the callback list.
 W/H  The contender won the homework assignment and was HIGH on the main challenge.
 W/F  The contender won the homework assignment and was first called back on the list.
 HIGH  The contender was called back without any notes.
 W/L  The contender won the homework assignment and was LOW on the main challenge.
 W/R  The contender won the homework assignment but was at risk of being eliminated.
 LOW  The contender was in risk of going to the bottom three but was ultimately safe.
 RISK  The contender sang for Ryan and was immediately safe.
 RISK  The contender was at risk of being eliminated.
 OUT  The contender was eliminated.
 W/O  The contender won the homework assignment but was eliminated.
 QUIT  The contender quit the competition.
 WINNER  The contender won a 7-episode arc on Glee.
 RUNNER-UP  The contender was crowned a runner-up.

International syndication

References

2011 American television series debuts
2012 American television series endings
2010s American music television series
2010s American reality television series
American television spin-offs
English-language television shows
Reality television spin-offs
Singing talent shows
Television series by Embassy Row (production company)
Television series by Sony Pictures Television
Glee (TV series)
Oxygen (TV channel) original programming